Agricantus (from the Latin: the singing of the corn field) is a Sicilian musical group playing mixed genres. Founded in Palermo, Italy, in 1979, the group has included many artists, including, in alphabetical order, Tonj Acquaviva (vocals, drums, sequencer and percussion), Mario Crispi (wind, vocals), Danila Laguardia (vocals), Massimo Laguardia (frame drums, percussion, vocals), Pippo Pollina (vocals, guitar), Mario Rivera (electric bass, vocals), Salvo Siciliano (guitar, keyboards).

The band has been formed by various lineups.
The musical work was then taken up by two distinct autonomous lineups:
In the 2010 Tonj Acquaviva and Rosie Wiederkehr took the name Agricantus adding “by Tonj Acquaviva.
In 2012 Mario Rivera, Mario Crispi e Paolo Dossena took the name Agricantus with the addition “reunion”.

History
Agricantus has performed a mixture of musical styles, languages and dialects, modern sounds and archaic musical instruments, through three decades of music. They reached their artistic maturity in the second part of the 1990s, following a particularly prosperous period for world music production in Italy. Their history can then be divided into these main periods.

1980-1991
Their artistic career was initially inspired by the revival of Andean music and South American folk culture exemplified by the Nueva Canción Chilena.
At the beginning of the 1980s, the band was part of the popular Sicilian folk scene (Rosa Balistreri, famous folk-singer, Ignazio Buttitta, famous popular poetry, Ciccio Busacca, famous street story-singer, and other artists) drawing encouragement and inspiration to pursue their own path and engaging actively in the promotion of popular music in Sicily.
the grou was founded in 1984 in Palermo and performed in numerous concerts throughout Europe and in prestigious occasions such as folk music and world music festivals.

1992-1999
Agricantus developed a mature musical language at the beginning of the 1990s with the release of Gnanzù! which was dedicated to the music of Southern Italy, the result of a research of the oral tradition recorded in the field and re-arranged through new technologies using traditional sounds. This new phase also coincides with the joining of the Swiss singer Rosie Wiederkehr who was the lead singer of the group until 2008.
Since 1995, following a signature of a discographic contract with Compagnia Nuove Indye and the production directed by Paolo Dossena the band produced more thematic discs (concept album) in which often use a mixture of European and non European languages side by side to the Sicilian language, using too electronic musical instruments and ethnic groups from various parts of the world.
Tuareg, 1996, can be considered the most representative album, with which Agricantus have received several national awards.
At this stage, the band has also developed more collaborations with the world of cinema
and has participated in international music compilations.
This allowed Agricantus to overlook the panorama of world music beyond the Italian borders with the publication in the USA of the collection “The Best of Agricantus”.
In 1997 they published “Hale Bopp Souvenir”, named after the  Comet Hale-Bopp, an EP that bears witness to the encounter with the Tuareg singer Fadimata Wallet Oumar
In 1998 they published Kaleidos second concept album, based on a mixture with classical music.

2000-2008
In 2000 Agricantus sign the soundtrack of the film Placido Rizzotto of Pasquale Scimeca which is published by the eponymous CD.

In 2001 they published Ethnosphere third concept album dedicated to the world and the spirituality of Tibetan culture. The album, inspired by some lyrics and music composed by Tonj Acquaviva and Rosie Wiederkehr as part of the multimedia project Welt Labyrinth, organized in support of the struggle for the independence of Tibet.

In 2002 the song “Amatevi” (co-written with Pivio and Aldo De Scalzi) is included in the famous compilation of world music/ambient/chill out Buddha Bar IV.

In 2005, the interruption of production with the label and, at the same time, the simultaneous expulsion of Mario Rivera, there is the release of the album Habibi, that is disavowed by group members.

The artistic activity continues then with the collaboration of DJ Ravin, with the creation of the soundtrack The Son of the Moon of Gianfranco Albano and with the publication of Luna khîna, published by Raitrade: This is the last album that also will mark the end of the collaboration between Acquaviva and Wiederkehr with Crispi, which took place at the end of 2008.

Individual projects 
In 2008, Mario Crispi was expelled from the Agricantus group, giving rise to the formation “Arenaria” and “Insulae” (this one with Enzo Favata), Mario Rivera intensify its collaborations (Piccola Banda Ikona) and production (O.S.T. of “Notturno Bus” film), In the same year Tonj Acquaviva with Rosie Wiederkehr, released the album "Millenium klima" with the name "Acquaviva". Work often associated with the continuation of musical Agricantus by fans and critics. [26] [27] [28] [29]
Article submission.

2010-2014 
In 2010, Tonj Acquaviva and Rosie Wiederkehr resume the name Agricantus.
In 2011 Agricantus receive the award for the Mediterranean culture Bodini, that the group will dedicate to Amnesty International, which will be present at their live for the fiftieth anniversary of the founding, doing a series of concerts and TV broadcasts. In May 2012 Agricantus play in Barcelona in support of free radio, will be published in a CD with songs of all participants in the festival. On August 7, 2012 on Rai Uno Tonj Acquaviva announces the release of the new concept album Kuntarimari, thematic work inspired by the tales of the sea with various collaborations of international musicians. And in an interview on August 10 Ecoradio, send a preview of the title track of the album "Kuntarimari".  In October 2012, the Agricantus have the Cd Kuntarimari in Barcelona the seat of the SGAE (Spanish Society authors publishers). In November, the album will be presented to the “house of the Italian” with a screening of the documentary "Agricantus by Tonj Acquaviva" dedicated to the greatest composer of the band. The presentation will be made at the concert Tradicionarius, the theater more representative for world music in Barcelona, within the festival "Cose di Amilcare," in collaboration with the Catalan festival "Barnasants." Creator of the festival Sergio Sacchi Secondiano "cultural soul" of the Club Tenco, (the festival that in 1996 awarded the Targa Tenco Group Agricantus) of the event will be made a CD, "Cose di Amilcare" with songs of all participants in the festival. At the end of 2012 Mario Crispi, Mario Rivera and Paolo Dossena meet and decide to resume production of Agricantus through the project "reunion", calling on all artists who in the past had contributed to the creative level in various capacities, including, Acquaviva and Wiederkehr. Acquaviva and Wiederkehr respond negatively to the invitation, because in full activity with Agricantus. Immediately after, unbeknownst to Acquaviva and Wiederkehr, Paolo Dossena, Mario Rivera and Mario Crispi register the mark Agricantus claiming to be the sole holder of the right to represent continuity with the original project. In the same year, Rivera, Crispi and Dossena create the formation "Agricantus Reunion" involving the musician Federica Zammarchi, as female voice, and Giovanni Lo Cascio on drums. With this lineup the band does some concerts and participates in the video / single Uommene / Omini produced by :Blob, Amnesty International and Legambiente. In August 2013 Tonj Acquaviva and Rosie Wiederkehr released the album Kuntarimari with Discmedi / Warner Music editions España receiving an excellent reception from audiences and critics. In 2014 Agricantus Reunion publish Turnari, early exit of the single 'Nsunnai and its video, nonché dal Concerto del Primo Maggio 2014 tenuto a Piazza San Giovanni a Roma, as well as from the Concerto del Primo Maggio 2014 held in Piazza San Giovanni in Rome, where Federica Zammarchi is considered to be the new voice of Agricantus Reunion.  Following the controversy triggered by the contemporary use of the name between, Mario Crispi, Mario Rivera, Paolo Dossena on the one hand, and on the other Tonj Acquaviva and Rosie Wiederkehr, the two sides, confirming the two different paths, testify to the bitter legal conflict still course.  To avoid overlapping Tonj Acquaviva and Rosie Wiederkehr decide to use Agricantus "by Acquaviva."

Discography

Agricantus

Album
1993 - Gnanzù!
1996 - Tuareg
1998 - Kaleidos
1999 - Faiddi
2001 - Ethnosphere
2005 - Habibi
2007 - Luna khina

EP
1995 - Viaggiari
1997 - Hale-Bopp souvenir
1998 - Amatevi
2002 - Jamila (with Francesco Bruno)

Collections
1999 - The best of Agricantus
2002 - Calura

Original soundtracks
Agricantus
2000 - Placido Rizzotto
2007 - Il figlio della luna
special guest in Trancendental/Pivio & Aldo De Scalzi scores
1997 - Il bagno turco (insieme a Pivio e Aldo De Scalzi)
1998 - I giardini dell'Eden (participation with the bonus track Amatevi)

Videos
1996 - Carizzi r'amuri 
2005 - Habibi

prizes
1996 - Targa Tenco: Tuareg - best dialect album 
1996 - P.I.M. Premio Italiano della Musica (la Repubblica) – best band of "frontier music"
1996 - Premio Augusto Daolio – Tuareg - best album sensitive to social issues

After the separation, there are now two distinct groups: Agricantus Reunion and Agricantus by Tonj Acquaviva:

Agricantus Reunion

Album
2014 - Turnari

Singles
2013 - Omini 
2014 –  'Nsunnai 
2013 – Uommene (con Pietra Montecorvino, Federica Zammarchi, Roberta Alloisio, Roberta Albanesi)
2014 –  'Nsunnai
2014 – Backstage Turnari

Video
2013 – Uommene (con Pietra Montecorvino, Federica Zammarchi, Roberta Alloisio, Roberta Albanesi)
2014 – 'Nsunnai
2014 – Backstage Turnari

Agricantus by Tonj Acquaviva

Album
2008 - Millennium Klima
2013 - Kuntarimari

Videos
2009 – Bukuto 
2013 – Divinità

Prizes
2011 - Bodini Prize (Culture for Mediterranean)

References

Musical groups from Sicily